Kaarina Koivuniemi (born 13 April 1932) is a Finnish athlete. She competed in the women's discus throw at the 1952 Summer Olympics.

References

1932 births
Living people
Athletes (track and field) at the 1952 Summer Olympics
Finnish female discus throwers
Olympic athletes of Finland
Place of birth missing (living people)